Allorhynchium malayanum is a species of wasp in the Vespidae family.

References

Potter wasps